Walter José Roque (8 May 1937 – 30 December 2014) was a Uruguayan football player and coach.

Career
Born in Montevideo, Roque played club football as a left winger for Rampla Juniors and Argentine club Atlanta. He also earned 15 caps for Uruguay, scoring twice, including appearing in 2 FIFA World Cup qualifying matches.

He later became a football manager, and was in charge of the Venezuela national team between 1978 and 1985, and Bolivia in 2003.

Career statistics

International

Later life and death
He died on 30 December 2014, at the age of 77.

References

1937 births
2014 deaths
Uruguayan footballers
Uruguay international footballers
Rampla Juniors players
Club Atlético Atlanta footballers
Argentine Primera División players
Association football wingers
Uruguayan expatriate footballers
Uruguayan expatriates in Argentina
Expatriate footballers in Argentina
Uruguayan football managers
Uruguayan expatriate football managers
Uruguayan expatriate sportspeople in Venezuela
Expatriate football managers in Venezuela
Venezuela national football team managers
Uruguayan expatriates in Bolivia
Expatriate football managers in Bolivia
Bolivia national football team managers
Estudiantes de Mérida managers
Deportivo Táchira F.C. managers
1983 Copa América managers
Centro Atlético Fénix managers
UA Maracaibo managers